Budzma! Tuzin. Perazagruzka-2 is a compilation album by a dozen Belarusian and foreign bands and solo performers, who usually sing in Russian, English, and Ukrainian, but made covers of their songs in Belarusian. The CD was released by the public movement Budzma Belarusians! and the music portal Tuzin.fm in December 2011. The project was visualized by Siarhei Budkin. The presentation of the compilation, which was headlined by Oleg Skrypka, took place at the Minsk club "Loft" on December 15, 2011.

Tracklisting

Reception 
In her review for the magazine Большой, Taciana Zamiroŭskaja described the compilation as a "wonderful project by the site Tuzin.fm and the campaign Budzma Belarusians! and wrote that "the CD turned out to be quite good." Reviewing for the European Radio for Belarus, Ilya Malinovsky noted that it is "really high-quality music from the real professionals in all music styles."

At the "Ultra-Music Awards 2011" ceremony, the CD was honored as "Project of the Year."

In 2018, Tuzin.fm, together with Letapis.by, selected the song “Краіна мрой” by Vopli Vidopliassova in the top “60 today’s hits in the Belarusian language,” a list of best songs released since 1988.

In 2019, Lesha Gorbash from 34mag included the project in the list of the most significant events in Belarusian music for the period 2010-2019.

Footnotes

References

External links 
 Listen to the album (SoundCloud)
 

2011 compilation albums
Compilation albums by Belarusian artists